Tombali SC is a Guinea-Bissauan football club based in Catio. They play in the amateur Guinean amateur football league, the Campeonato Nacional da Guine-Bissau.

Players

Tombali SC